Olga María Sacasa Cruz (born 17 June 1961) is a track and road cyclist from Nicaragua. She represented her nation at the 1992 Summer Olympics on the track in the women's sprint and individual pursuit. Although she was on the startlist for the women's road race, she did not start the race. At 1992 Olympic women's track cycling pursuit qualifying round she established an Olympic Record for Nicaragua. Was graduated with a German/Pre-med major from Mount Holyoke College, 1984. Graduated BS in PT at University of New Mexico, 1999.

Results

References

External links
 profile at sports-reference.com

1961 births
Living people
Nicaraguan female cyclists
Cyclists at the 1992 Summer Olympics
Olympic cyclists of Nicaragua
Place of birth missing (living people)

Mount Holyoke College alumni